Together may refer to:

Literature
 Together (book), a 2005 children's book by Dimitrea Tokunbo and Jennifer Gwynne Oliver
 Together (magazine), an international lifestyle magazine

Organizations
 Together for Mental Wellbeing, a UK mental health charity
 Together campaign, by US cities, to help consumers fight climate change
 Together (Australia), a trade union in the state of Queensland, Australia
 Spolu (Czech Republic) (Together), a centre-right coalition of parties in the Czech Republic
 Together (Belarus), opposition liberal unregistered party of Belarus
 Together (Hungary), a social-liberal political party in Hungary
 Together (Italy), a progressive coalition of parties in Italy
 Together (Serbia), a green political party in Serbia
 Together for Serbia, defunct political party in Serbia
 Ensemble! (Together!), a left-wing political party in France
 Ensemble Citoyens (Together), a liberal political coalition in France
 Left Together, a leftist political party in Poland
 TOGETHER – Civic Democracy, a liberal-conservative party in Slovakia

Film and TV

Film
 Together (1956 film), a British drama directed by Lorenza Mazzetti
 Together (1971 film), an American film directed by Sean S. Cunningham and starring Marilyn Chambers
 Together?, a 1979 Italian film starring Jacqueline Bissett
 Together (2000 film), a Swedish comedy drama directed by Lukas Moodysson
 Together (2002 film), a Chinese drama directed by Chen Kaige
 Together (2009 film), a British short directed by Eicke Bettinga and starring Matt Smith
 Together (2009 Mexican film), a film by Nicolás Pereda
 Together (2011 film), a Chinese documentary by Zhao Liang
 Together (2018 film), a British film directed by Paul Duddridge
 Together, a 2018 American short directed by Terrence Malick
 Together (2021 film), a British film
 Together (2021 short film), a Canadian short directed by Albert Shin
 Together (2022 film), a Czech psychological drama

Television
 Together (1980 TV series), a British soap opera made by Southern Television
 Together (Singaporean TV series), a 2009 Singaporean program
 ToGetHer, a 2009 Taiwanese drama starring Rainie Yang, Jiro Wang and George Hu
 Together (2015 TV series), a 2015 British sitcom
 Together (TV channel), a UK-based television channel, owned by The Community Channel CBS

Music

Bands
 Together (British band), a 1990s rave band
 Together (French duo), a 2000s house-music duo
 Together, a group with a 1997 number-one single in Sweden

Albums
 Together (Anne Murray album), 1975
 Together (Country Joe and the Fish album), 1968
 Together (Dave Dee, Dozy, Beaky, Mick & Tich album), 1969
 Together! (Elvin Jones and Philly Joe Jones album), 1961
 Together (Eric Kloss and Barry Miles album) or the title song, 1977
 Together (Ferry Corsten album) or the title song, 2003
 Together (Golden Earring album), 1972
 Together (Jane album) or the title song, 1972
 Together (Jerry Lee Lewis album), 1969
 Together (Joe Williams and Harry Edison album), 1961
 Together (John Farnham and Allison Durbin album), 1971
 Together (Jonathan and Charlotte album), 2012
 Together (Larry Coryell and Emily Remler album), 1985
 Together (Lollipop album), 2004
 Together (Lulu album), 2002
 Together (Marcus & Martinus album) or the title song, 2016
 Together (Marina Prior and Mark Vincent album), 2016
 Together (Marvin Gaye and Mary Wells album), 1964
 Together (McCoy Tyner album), 1979
 Together (Michael Ball and Alfie Boe album), 2016
 Together (The New Pornographers album), 2010
 Together (The New Seekers album), 1974
 Together (The Oak Ridge Boys album), 1980
 Together (Reef album), 2003
 Together (Jolin Tsai album), 2001
 Together (S Club Juniors album) or the title song, 2002
 Together (S.H.E album), 2003
 Together (Sister Sledge album), 1977
 Together (Steve Kuhn and Toshiko Akiyoshi album) or The Country and Western Sound of Jazz Pianos, 1963
 Together (The Supremes and the Temptations album), 1969
 Together (Tommy Flanagan and Kenny Barron album), 1979
 Together: A New Chuck Mangione Concert, 1971
 Together: Edgar Winter and Johnny Winter Live, 1976
 Together, by Blake, 2009
 Together, by Duster, 2022
 Together, by FanFan, 2012
 Together, by Gaither Vocal Band and Ernie Haase & Signature Sound, 2007
 Together, by Jackpine Savage (Bruce Haack), 1971
 Together, by Jesse Colin Young, 1972
 Together, by Louis Prima & Keely Smith, 1960
 Together, by the Vapors, or the title song, 2020
 Together, by the Watts 103rd Street Rhythm Band, 1968

EPs
 Together, by Beyond, 2003
 Together, by Tiësto, 2019

Songs
 "Together" (1928 song), a pop standard by Buddy G. DeSylva, Lew Brown, and Ray Henderson
 "Together" (Amii Stewart and Mike Francis song), 1985
 "Together" (Ella Eyre song), 2015
 "Together" (For King & Country, Tori Kelly and Kirk Franklin song), 2020
 "Together" (The Intruders song), 1967; covered by Tierra, 1980
 "Together" (Krystal Meyers song), 2006
 "Together" (Pet Shop Boys song), 2010
 "Together" (Ryan O'Shaughnessy song), represented Ireland in Eurovision 2018
 "Together" (Selah Sue song), 2016
"Together" (Sia song), 2020
 "Together" (Together song), 2000
 "Together" (TVXQ song), 2007
 "Together (Wherever We Go)", by Jule Styne and Stephen Sondheim from the musical Gypsy, 1959
 "Juntos (Together)", by Juanes, 2015
 "Together", by Artificial Funk, 2002
 "Together", by Avril Lavigne from Under My Skin, 2004
 "Together", by Beabadoobee from Fake It Flowers, 2020
 "Together", by Bob Sinclar from Soundz of Freedom, 2007
 "Together", by Boyzone from Said and Done, 1995
 "Together", by Callie Twisselman from My Little Pony: A New Generation, 2021
 "Together", by Calvin Harris from Motion, 2014
 "Together", by Demi Lovato from Unbroken, 2011
 "Together", by Diana Ross from Ross, 1978
 "Together", by Disclosure from Settle: The Remixes, 2013
 "Together", by Harry Nilsson from Aerial Ballet, 1968
 "Together", by Helen Reddy from Rarities from the Capitol Vaults, 2009
 "Together", by Keith Moon from Two Sides of the Moon, 1975
 "Together", by Marshmello from Joytime II, 2018
 "Together", by Martin Garrix from Seven, 2016
 "Together", by Masta Ace from Take a Look Around, 1990
 "Together", by Mitch Tambo, competing to represent Australia in the Eurovision Song Contest 2020
 "Together", by the Raconteurs from Broken Boy Soldiers, 2006
 "Together", by Ruben Studdard from Love Is, 2009
 "Together", by Skindred from Babylon, 2002
 "Together", by Suede, a B-side of the single "New Generation", 1995
 "Together", by Trippie Redd from Life's a Trip, 2018
 "Together", by the xx from The Great Gatsby: Music from Baz Luhrmann's Film, 2013
 "Together", by Ziggy Alberts, 2020

Other uses
 Borland Together, a Unified Modeling Language tool designed by Borland
 Operation Moshtarak, an ISAF campaign in Afghanistan
 Yahoo Together, messaging app by Yahoo

See also 
 2gether (disambiguation)
 Juntos (disambiguation)
 Together Again (disambiguation)
 Together Forever (disambiguation)
 Togetherness (disambiguation)